Glamour Belles is an American reality series that aired from April 6 until April 20, 2011.

Premise
Paige Burcham Carlton runs a pageant-dress shop in Union City, Tennessee.

Cast
Paige Burcham Carlton
JoAnn Burcham
Jared Hamlin
Nikki Williams
Brooke Beachum
Stephanie Sergerson

Episodes

References

External links
 
TV Guide
  

2011 American television series debuts
2011 American television series endings
2010s American reality television series
English-language television shows
Lifetime (TV network) original programming
Television shows set in Tennessee